Erciyes University is a Turkish institute of higher education located in Kayseri, Turkey. As of 4 April 2019, a total of 64,194 students were studying for their bachelor's degree and postgraduate studies.

Background

Erciyes University began as the Gevher Nesibe Medical Faculty, which was opened as an affiliation with Hacettepe University in 1969, and Kayseri Business Administration Faculty, which opened in 1977, constituted an independent university under the name of The University of Kayseri in 1978. In 1982, the other two higher education institutions in Kayseri were incorporated into the same university as Faculty of Engineering and Faculty of Theology. Then its name was converted to Erciyes University.

The name of the university has an inspiration from Mount Erciyes, which is 15 kilometres to the southwest of the university. Today, besides a campus in Kayseri's city center, the university runs its activities in central Anatolia, which provides education in 17 faculties, 14 vocational high schools, four institutions and nine research centers, and a highly developed research hospital with 1,000 beds. Establishment of Erciyes University dates back to 1978 under the name of Kayseri University. It was established as an affiliate of Hacettepe University in Ankara. Kayseri Business Administration Faculty, founded in 1977, constituted the nucleus of Kayseri University which was converted into Erciyes University. The other two higher education institutes; the Theology Institute founded in 1967, and Kayseri State Higher Education Academy founded in 1977,  were incorporated into the university as the Faculty of Theology and the Faculty of Engineering. The name of the university was inspired by Mount Erciyes (3,917 m), which lies 15 kilometers to the south-west of the university. In addition to the Faculty of Medicine, the Faculty of Economics and Administrative Sciences, the Faculty of Theology, the Faculty of Engineering, and the Faculty of Arts and Sciences and the following faculties were added: in 1992 the Faculty of Architecture and Fine Arts, in 1993 the Faculty of Architecture and Engineering located in Yozgat, in 1995 the Faculty of Veterinary Sciences in Kayseri and the Faculty of Economics and Administrative Sciences in Yozgat, in 1997 the Faculty of Economics and Administrative Sciences in Nevşehir, the Faculty of Dentistry and the Faculty of Communication, in 2002 the Faculty of Education, in 2003 the Faculty of Law and the Faculty of Pharmacology and in 2005, the Develi Seyrani Faculty of Agriculture.

Some Colleges of Erciyes University include: the Physical Education and Sports College, Kayseri Atatürk Health College, the Civil Aviation College, the School of Foreign Languages, the Tourism and Hotel Management College, Nevşehir College of Tourism and Hotel Management, Nevşehir Health College and Yozgat Health College. Vocational colleges include: Kayseri Vocational College, Halil Bayraktar Health Services Vocational College, Safiye Çıkrıkçıoğlu Vocational College, Kocasinan Vocational College, the Vocational School of Social Sciences, Nevşehir Vocational College, Yozgat Vocational College and Develi Vocational College.

The faculties located in Yozgat and Nevşehir separated from Erciyes University and became part of Bozok and Nevşehir universities in 2008. In 2010, the Faculty of Arts and Sciences was reorganized and became the Faculty of Science and the Faculty of Letters. Atatürk Health College became the Faculty of Health Sciences, Atatürk’s Principles and Reforms Appliance and Research Center became Atatürk’s Principles and History Institute, and in the same year the Institute of Educational Sciences was founded.  In the 2009-2010 academic year more than 30,000 students were in attendance at Erciyes university. More than 500 Students from the Turkic republics, Turkish and relative communities are presently studying at Erciyes University.

In 2017 Erciyes University was chosen as one of the first 10 universities to be classified as a research university in Turkey.

Location
Erciyes University is located in Kayseri which has a population 1.390.000 people. It is only 6 kilometers away from the city centre.

Faculties, departments and schools
The university faculties are follows: Faculty of Medicine, Faculty of Economics and Administrative Sciences, Faculty of Theology, Faculty of Engineering, and Faculty of Arts and Sciences.

The following faculties were added after 1992: Faculty of Architecture and Fine Arts (1992), Yozgat Architecture and Engineering Faculty (1993), Faculty of Veterinary in Kayseri (1995), and Faculty of Economics and Administrative Sciences and Faculty of Arts and Sciences in Yozgat; in 1997 Faculty of Economics and Administrative Sciences (Faculty of Economics and Business Administration) in Nevşehir were established. Faculty of Dentistry was found in 2001.

Undergraduate programs
The bachelor's degree is awarded to students who successfully complete an eight-semester course of study (approximately 120 credit units). Students must fulfill all the degree requirements determined by their department; at graduation their cumulative grade point average must be 2.00 or higher on a scale of 4.00.

These colleges provide a four-year education: Vocational School of Physical Education and Sports, Atatürk Health College, School of Foreign Languages Civil Aviation College in Kayseri, School of Tourism and Hotel Management, Nevşehir Health College in Nevşehir and Yozgat Health College in Yozgat.

Vocational schools provide a two-year education: Kayseri Vocational College, Halil Bayraktar Health Services Vocational College, Safiye Çıkrıkçıoğlu Vocational College and Kocasinan Vocational College in Kayseri and Yozgat Vocational College in Yozgat and Nevşehir Vocational College in Nevşehir.

Postgraduate studies
At Erciyes University, postgraduate studies have begun to increase, particularly since 1984. Currently there are 6.515 Master of Arts and Sciences and Social Sciences, students and 1.576 Doctorate students  continuing their education in the institutes of Sciences, Health Sciences and Social Sciences.

Staff
The number of the teaching staff at the university has reached a desired level; there are 205 professors, 86 associate professors, 274 assistant professors, 164 lecturers, 171 instructors, 47 experts and 602 research assistants. The school employs 2209 academic personnel and 4795 administrative personnel.

Development
Erciyes University is highly developed and thus well organized compared to the standards of Turkey. Moreover, it caters to the needs of its neighbourhood, particularly in the field of education and health and it has united with it. Some important parts of sub-structures and service facilities of Erciyes University have been built by the charitable businessmen in the vicinity. Some of the faculties have already been completed and they are in use; others are under construction.

Since 2006, the Erciyes University has its own Technology Park, the Erciyes Teknopark where around 230  Research & Development firms are developing new technologies.

Ranking

The university is considered one of the top 20 universities in Turkey. US News ranks the school among the top 500 global universities in Asia In 2021, Erciyes University was recognized among the top 100 “green and eco-friendly” universities in the world by UI GreenMetric.

See also
 Erciyes University Radio Observatory

References

External links
Erciyes University
Ziraat Fakültesi

 
Educational institutions established in 1978
Buildings and structures in Kayseri
1978 establishments in Turkey